Massanutten Military Academy (MMA) is a coeducational military school for grades 5 through 12 and one academic postgraduate year, located in Woodstock, Virginia, United States.

History
The Massanutten Military Academy, named for the nearby mountain, was established by the Virginia Classis of the Reformed Church in 1899. The school opened on September 12, 1899, with 40 students, half of whom were boarders. From the beginning the school was coed, with the first graduating class in 1902 consisting of three boys and three girls. In 1905, the first of two significant events in the history of the school occurred: Howard J. Benchoff was appointed the school president. He stayed in that position for nearly five decades, to be succeeded for the next decade and a half by his son. Lantz Hall, the second structure on the academy grounds, was begun in 1907 and dedicated in 1909, to accommodate a growing student population.

During the early years of his stewardship Benchoff established several policies. The first was expanding the school size to include number of students, staff, buildings, and acreage. The second, as a result of an otherwise undocumented "incident", was limiting the boarding department to boys beginning in 1910. The last policy, and the second significant event in the school's early history, was adopting a military program. While the program was not implemented until 1917, early in his tenure Benchoff described the goal of a military program as "to train the boys with a discipline that is valuable and give them that easy and graceful carriage which is an accomplishment in any gentleman's claim to culture" In 1930 after receiving an application and inspecting the existing program, the U.S. War Department formally made the school a JROTC unit "placing it on a par with the highest rated military schools in the country".

Currently, the school has a strong academic program with the graduating class of 2017, which consisted of 24 students, earning more than $2,000,000 in scholarships alone. The school also has a strong STEM Program that focuses on experiential learning.

Administration
Kim Elshafie is the current head of school. She is the former dean of academics as well.
The Commandant of cadets is Lieutenant Colonel Lester Layman, U.S. Army (Ret.).
Average enrollment is around 125 students
MMA is fully accredited by the Virginia Association of Independent Schools (VAIS) and the Southern Association of Colleges and Schools (SACS).

Honor code
As part of its mission the academy has a Cadet Honor Code patterned after the one at West Point. "A cadet will not lie, cheat, or steal, nor tolerate those who do." The Cadet Honor Council consists of juniors and seniors selected by the senior class and the faculty, as approved by the head of school.  When a suspected honor code violation is reported, the Honor Council faculty advisers convene the council for a hearing at which the cadets involved are required to explain their conduct.  The Honor Council recommends punishment and/or other measures appropriate to educate the Cadet Corps about the expectations of honorable behavior.  Final approval lies with the head of school.  Continued, repeated violations of the Honor Code may warrant dismissal from the academy.

JROTC program

MMA's Junior Reserve Officers' Training Corps (JROTC) is consistently recognized as an Honor Unit with Distinction. Since 2011, MMA Cadets have qualified to compete in the JROTC Leadership and Academic Bowl (JLAB). Six times they have qualified for Level Two of the competition and three times they have qualified to compete at the national level. For the 2017 competition, MMA is placed in the top 24 programs in the nation and the #1 team in the 4th Brigade of Cadet Command.

Notable alumni
Jack Ham, professional football player; College Football Hall of Fame and Pro Football Hall of Fame	
Mia Khalifa, Internet celebrity and former pornographic film actor
Tyrese Martin (2018), professional basketball player for the Atlanta Hawks 
Frank Mason III (2012), professional basketball player for the Sacramento Kings 
Admiral Alfred C. Richmond, Commandant United States Coast Guard (1954–62)
Jamorko Pickett (2017), professional basketball player for the Cleveland Charge of the NBA G League
Dereon Seabron (2019), player for the New Orleans Pelicans of the National Basketball Association

References

External links
Official website
Virginia Association of Independent Schools
Boarding School Review
Association of Military Colleges and Schools of the United States (AMCSUS)
Massanutten Military Academy JROTC Insignia

1899 establishments in Virginia
Boarding schools in Virginia
Educational institutions established in 1899
Military high schools in the United States
Preparatory schools in Virginia
Private high schools in Virginia
Private middle schools in Virginia
Schools in Shenandoah County, Virginia